Jean Collet (3 March 1932 – 11 November 2020) was a French writer, cinematic theorist, and university professor.

Biography
Born in Pau, Collet studied at the École nationale supérieure Louis-Lumière and Paris-Sorbonne University, where he earned a degree in philosophy. He was notably inspired by the work of Gaston Bachelard.

Collet worked as a journalist for Télérama from 1959 to 1971 and at Cahiers du Cinéma from 1961 to 1968. In 1965, he began working as a film critic for Études. He also ran film clubs around France under the authority of the Alliance française.

Collet wrote many books on cinema. In particular, he devoted a monograph to Jean-Luc Godard published by Éditions Seghers. He also worked to make cinema a major in French universities, creating the cinema department at Paris Diderot University. He served as a professor at Paris Descartes University, the Centre Sèvres, and the Institut national de l'audiovisuel. He also worked for Arte. A contributor to Encyclopædia Universalis, he was a film advisor to various other dictionaries and encyclopedias.

Jean Collet died on 11 November 2020 at the age of 88.

Books
Jean-Luc Godard (1963)
Le Cinéma en question : Rozier, Chabrol, Rivette, Truffaut, Demy, Rohmer (1972)
Lectures du film (1977)
Le Cinéma de François Truffaut (1977)
La Nouvelle Vague, 25 ans après (1983)
François Truffaut (1985)
La Création selon Fellini (1990)
Après le film (1999)
John Ford, la violence et la loi (2003)
François Truffaut. La profondeur secrète d'une œuvre géniale, enfin révélée (2004)
Petite Théologie du cinéma (2014)
L'Art de voir un film (2015)
Tout sur François Truffaut (2020)

References

1932 births
2020 deaths
French writers
People from Pau, Pyrénées-Atlantiques
Paris-Sorbonne University alumni